This is a list of the tallest habitable buildings on the island of Ireland (used for living and working in, as opposed to masts and churches). This includes both Northern Ireland, United Kingdom and the Republic of Ireland. The island of Ireland has relatively few tall buildings. As of 2017, there were several proposals to change this, with developments proposed for Cork, Limerick, Galway, and Dublin.

Tallest habitable buildings

Northern Ireland

Republic of Ireland

Tallest buildings by city
This list only includes cities with buildings taller than 50m. Cities in light blue are in Northern Ireland.

Under construction

Cancelled
The below list contains details of buildings with a planned height of over 50m which were under construction but where the project was stopped or cancelled.

See also
 List of tallest structures in Ireland
 List of tallest buildings and structures in Belfast
List of tallest buildings and structures in Dublin

References

Ireland
Tallest
Ireland